Xylosma congesta, commonly known as shiny xylosma, is a species of flowering plant native to China.

Discovery
The species was first recorded in China by Jesuit missionary João de Loureiro.

Description
New leaves are a red-bronze colour that mature to a bright green. Although the species seldom flowers, small, black berries can be produced, which attract birds.

Uses
Xylosma congesta is used as anti-inflammatory and as a birthing aid. The ethanolic extract of its leaves is antimelanogenic (prevents melanogenesis) and is used in skin products.

References

congesta
Taxa named by João de Loureiro